The 2019 election to the Senate of the Netherlands was held on 27 May 2019, two months after the provincial elections.

Forum for Democracy, which took part for the first time, became the largest party. This was later undone by several party splits.

Electoral system
The Senate consists of 75 members elected every four years by the members of the States-Provincial of the country's twelve provinces, and, following a law change in 2017, electoral colleges representing the special municipalities of Bonaire, Sint Eustatius and Saba, who are in turn elected directly by the citizens two months earlier in the 2019 provincial and electoral college elections. The seats are distributed in one nationwide constituency using party-list proportional representation.

The value of each elector's vote is determined by the population of the province or special municipality which the elector represents, at a ratio of approximately 1 vote per 100 residents.

Seat projections

Results

Electors

Senate 
Rutte III lost its majority in the senate.

Results summary

References

2019
Senate